Thurmann is a Norwegian surname. Notable people with the surname include:

 Jacob Thurmann Ihlen (1833–1903), Norwegian politician
 Peder Cappelen Thurmann
 Wincentz Thurmann Ihlen (1826–1892), Norwegian engineer

See also
 Thurman (disambiguation)

Norwegian-language surnames